Karvounari is a village and a community in the municipal unit of Paramythia in Thesprotia, Greece. Its population in 2011 was 523. It is 5 km northeast of Margariti, 8 km southwest of Paramythia and 22 km southeast of Igoumenitsa.

History
In 1928, representatives from the Cham communities in Paramythia, Karvounari and Filiates, requested the opening of two Muslim schools which they would fund themselves. The Greek authorities officially rejected the request, fearing that these Muslim schools would serve Albanian state propaganda by promoting an anti-Greek sentiment among the Chams of Greece. Regardless, the Greek government allowed their operation unofficially because it could close them as illegal at any time, and could also claim that their function fulfilled demands for Albanian schools in Chameria. A mass exodus of Chams from Greece occurred as a result of the greco-italian war and the German occupation of Greece in the 1940s, so that today no such population exists.

See also

List of settlements in Thesprotia

External links
Karvounari at the GTP Travel Pages

References

Populated places in Thesprotia
Former Cham settlements